Diogo da Costa Oliveira, commonly just Diogo, (born January 4, 1988) is a retired Brazilian football player who played both as a fullback and winger, mainly on the right side.

Career

Sport Club Internacional
Diogo started his career at Sport Club Internacional from Porto Alegre. Before becoming professional he won many championships and leagues with the youth team, specially the Brazil National Championship Sub-20, playing in the same team of Alexandre Pato.

He became professional exactly in the best moment of the club's history. Because of that he trained along with the team that ended year 2006 as champion of FIFA Club World Cup against FC Barcelona.

Norway
Diogo signed a one-year contract with Stabæk Fotball before the 2010 season. He scored his first and only goal for Stabæk against Vålerenga on September 12, 2010. The contract was not renewed.

Sweden and Finland
In August 2013 Diogo joined Swedish club Vasalunds IF, but did not play any games.

In 2014 and 2015, Diogo played 18 matches for Inter Turku in the Veikkausliiga.

References

External links
Guardian's Stats Centre

1988 births
Living people
Brazilian footballers
Sport Club Internacional players
Stabæk Fotball players
FC Inter Turku players
Eliteserien players
Veikkausliiga players
Brazilian expatriate footballers
Expatriate footballers in Norway
Brazilian expatriate sportspeople in Norway
Expatriate footballers in Sweden
Brazilian expatriate sportspeople in Sweden
Expatriate footballers in Finland
Brazilian expatriate sportspeople in Finland
Åbo IFK players
Association football defenders
Association football midfielders
Footballers from São Paulo